, unofficially designated , is a sub-kilometer near-Earth asteroid of the Apollo group, approximately  in diameter. First observed for eleven days by the Catalina Sky Survey in 2010, the asteroid was recovered in May 2018 during its sub-lunar close encounter with Earth.

First observation and recovery 

 was first observed by astronomers with the Catalina Sky Survey on 30 November 2010 with a 1-day observation arc and was observed through 10 December 2010. By 10 December 2010, the asteroid was more than 24 million kilometers from Earth at apparent magnitude 21.8 and was becoming too faint to be practical to track.

The preliminary 10-day observation arc generated a line of variation roughly 15 million km long for May 2018 that did not intersect Earth's orbit and thus was not a 2018 impact threat. The asteroid was recovered on 8 May 2018 when it was 8 million kilometers from Earth and given the temporary NEOCP designation ZJ99C60. It was removed from the Sentry Risk Table on 10 May 2018 and is not an impact threat for the next 100 years or more. The asteroid now has a secure 7-year observation arc.

Orbit and classification 
 is an Apollo asteroid, the largest dynamical group of near-Earth objects with nearly 10,000 known members. It orbits the Sun at a distance of 0.78–1.4 AU once every 13 months (409 days; semi-major axis of 1.08 AU). Its orbit has an eccentricity of 0.28 and an inclination of 18° with respect to the ecliptic.

2018 approach 
On 15 May 2018, 22:05 UT, the asteroid approached Earth at just over 0.5 LD, the closest approach of this asteroid in nearly 300 years. It was expected to reach apparent magnitude +11 at closest approach, bright enough to be seen in a small telescope if you have a custom ephemeris for your location. At closest approach, it was best seen from the Southern hemisphere such as South Africa and southern South America. The asteroid passed Earth going .

This was the third closest approach ever observed by an asteroid with absolute magnitude (H) brighter than 24.

Physical characteristics

Diameter 

As the asteroid has not been directly resolved by telescope, its diameter can only be estimated based on the distance and brightness. Based on a generic magnitude-to-diameter conversion, it is estimated to measure between 60 and 130 meters in diameter, for an absolute magnitude of 23.5, and an assumed albedo of 0.04–0.20.

Numbering and naming 

As of 2018, this minor planet has neither been numbered nor named by the Minor Planet Center.

See also
 List of asteroid close approaches to Earth in 2018

References

External links 
 "Lost" asteroid to pass closely May 15 Eddie Irizarry, 12 May 2018
 Asteroid 2010 WC9 to flyby Earth at 0.53 LD on 15 May
 List Of Apollo Minor Planets (by designation), Minor Planet Center
 
 
 

Minor planet object articles (unnumbered)

20180515
20101130